Siming may refer to:

 Siming District, an urban district of Xiamen, Fujian, China
 Siming (deity), a deity or title thereof of the Director of Fate or Master of Destiny